Armada Township is one of twenty-six townships in Buffalo County, Nebraska, United States. The population was 261 at the 2000 census. By 2015, the population was estimated to be 305.

The Village of Miller lies within the Township. The zip code is 48005.

See also
County government in Nebraska

References

External links
City-Data.com

Townships in Buffalo County, Nebraska
Kearney Micropolitan Statistical Area
Townships in Nebraska